Peter Bosted is an American physicist. He completed his Ph.D. in Physics in January 1980 from Massachusetts Institute of Technology. His Ph.D. Thesis Title was, "Pion Photoproduction in the (3,3) Resonance Region". His Ph.D. Supervisor was Professor Aron Bernstein. He did his B.S. degree in Physics in June 1975 from the Massachusetts Institute of Technology (MIT). He did his post-doctoral training at MIT before he joined American University and served as a Postdoctoral associate (1980-1985), Associate Research Scientist (1985-1988), Research Associate Professor (1988-1997), and Research Professor (1997-1999). Later, He joined the University of Massachusetts, Amherst as a Research Professor. He has served at the Jefferson Laboratory as a Senior Staff Scientist and also served at the College of Williams and Mary.  He is currently involved in research work at Thomas Jefferson National Accelerator Facility and has published 100s of research papers in reputed scientific journals and was an Elected Fellow of the American Physical Society.

References

Year of birth missing (living people)
Living people
21st-century American physicists
Fellows of the American Physical Society